Robert Skolimowski (born 14 August 1956) is a Polish weightlifter. He competed in the men's super heavyweight event at the 1980 Summer Olympics.

References

1956 births
Living people
Polish male weightlifters
Olympic weightlifters of Poland
Weightlifters at the 1980 Summer Olympics
Sportspeople from Warsaw
World Weightlifting Championships medalists
20th-century Polish people
21st-century Polish people